Thomas Zink (born 14 April 1949 in Berlin) is a German mathematician. He currently holds a chair for arithmetic algebraic geometry at the University of Bielefeld. 
He has been doing research at the Institute for Advanced Study in Princeton, at the University of Toronto and at the University of Bonn among others.

In 1992, he was awarded the Gottfried Wilhelm Leibniz Prize of the Deutsche Forschungsgemeinschaft joint with Christopher Deninger (Westfälische Wilhelms-Universität of Münster), Michael Rapoport (University of Wuppertal) and Peter Schneider (University of Cologne). The four researchers succeeded to apply modern methods of algebraic geometry to the solution of diophantine equations. 
Furthermore, he is a member of the German Academy of Sciences Leopoldina (Halle an der Saale).

External links
 Homepage of Thomas Zink
 List of all Leibniz price laureates (DFG)  (PDF; 7,52 MB)

1949 births
Living people
20th-century German mathematicians
Gottfried Wilhelm Leibniz Prize winners
21st-century German mathematicians